Hazen Street is the eponymous debut by the band of the same name. Borne out of an original collaboration between Morse and Kennedy and named for the address of the N.Y.C. prison in which ex-Madball vocalist Cricien did a stint, the band mixed hard-hitting contemporary hardcore with metal, rap-rock, and pop overtones. Hazen Street signed with Benji and Joel Madden's Epic-distributed DC Flag imprint in 2003 and set to work on their debut with producer Howard Benson. Guitarist Chad Gilbert of New Found Glory also performed on the record, but commitments to NFG kept him from touring in support with Hazen Street. The self-titled effort was then issued in July 2004.

Track listing
All songs by Hazen Street and Chad Gilbert.

Members
 Toby Morse – vocals
 Freddy Cricien – vocals
 Hoya – bass
 Mackie Jason – drums
 David Kennedy – guitar
 Chad Gilbert – additional performance and songwriting
 Benji Madden – background vocals on "Are You Ready?" and "All That"
 Joel Madden – background vocals on "Are You Ready?" and "All That"

In other media
 "Are You Ready" was the official theme song of WWE Survivor Series 2006
 "Back Home" was featured on NBA 2K5
 "Fool The World" was featured in NHL 2005 and in Madden NFL 2005

Billboard chart positions
Top Heatseekers, #30
Billboard 200,#198

References 

Hazen Street albums
2004 debut albums
DC Flag Records albums
Albums produced by Howard Benson